DZLL (107.1 FM), broadcasting as 107.1 MemoRieS FM, is a radio station owned and operated by Primax Broadcasting Network. Its studio and transmitter are located at Primax Compound, Upper Dominican Hill, Baguio.

Profile
The station was established in 1992 as Mellow Touch, airing a soft adult contemporary format. In 1997, when FBS Radio Network sold the station to Primax, the station underwent transition under the Smooth Jazz branding, airing a smooth jazz format. Months later, it added soul and R&B to its playlist.

The following year, it was rebranded as City Lite with the tagline "Take it Easy". It was home of Beatbox, which airs only hip hop and R&B. Its notable morning program was The Breakfast Club. The station was an affiliate of Manila-based Raven Broadcasting Corporation, which owns a station with the same name. In 2002, the station cut ties with Raven and rebranded as Smooth FM with the tagline "Your Stress-Free Radio".

In March 2017, Smooth FM 107.1 became an affiliate of the Radio Mindanao Network and rebranded as MemoRies FM 107.1 with a classic hits format.

References

Radio stations in Baguio
Radio stations established in 1992